Garden of Ridván (lit. garden of paradise) may refer to:
Garden of Ridván, Baghdad
Garden of Ridván, Akka

See also
 Ridvan, a Turkish given name